Craig Staats is a member of the Pennsylvania House of Representatives, representing the 145th House district in Bucks County, Pennsylvania. Staats is a former Richland Township Supervisor, having served from 2006 to 2014. He succeeded Representative Paul Clymer who retired; in 2014 Craig Staats defeated Karen Chellew in the general election. In 2016, Craig Staats was re-elected, defeating challenger Vera Cole.

In 2016, Staats endorsed Donald Trump for President. Staats is the Marketing Chair of the Liquor Control Committee,  working to modernize hotel license laws.  Staats has been a vocal critic of Governor Tom Wolf, and a supporter of reopening businesses amid the COVID-19 pandemic in Pennsylvania.

Staats currently sits on the Education, Finance, Liquor Control, and State Government committees.

References

External links
Official Web Site
PA House profile

Living people
People from Bucks County, Pennsylvania
Republican Party members of the Pennsylvania House of Representatives
Johnson & Wales University alumni
Place of birth missing (living people)
21st-century American politicians
Year of birth missing (living people)